"Bum Bum Tam Tam" (also known by the title "Joga O Bum Bum Tam Tam") is a song recorded by Brazilian musician MC Fioti. The music video was released on 8 March 2017. The song samples Johann Sebastian Bach's Partita in A minor for solo flute.  The song has peaked at number one in the Netherlands and the top 5 in France.

The song's music video is currently the most viewed video from Brazil on YouTube.

Due to the similarity in sonority between "Bum Bum Tam Tam" and Instituto Butantan, the institute responsible for one of the COVID-19 vaccines to be distributed in Brazil, MC Fioti released a new version of the song in 2021, Vacina Butantan ("Butantan vaccine"). The modified lyrics incentive people to take the vaccine and was recorded inside the facilities of Instituto Butantan with employees dancing. One week after being posted, the video had amassed over six million views on YouTube.

Critical reception
The song received widespread critical acclaim from music critics. Billboard said the song "might just qualify as the biggest international banger the world has ever seen." Clash described the song saying "'Bum Bum Tam Tam' is the carefree phenomenon 2017 needs, the sort of ear-worm pop melody that can bring entire nations together." Vice described the song questioning if "Bum Bum Tam Tam is the best funk song in history?"

Music video
The official music video was released on 8 March 2017 on the KondZilla channel. It cost R$30,000 (Roughly US$7,700) to make. According to Fioti, "It was all last minute and it was perfect."

The music video has nearly 1.7 billion views and 11 million likes as of August 2022. It is also the most-viewed Brazilian music video and the first to hit 1 billion views.

Track listing

Charts

Release history

Remixes

Future, J Balvin, Stefflon Don and Juan Magán Remix

"Bum Bum Tam Tam (Remix)" was recorded alongside Colombian singer J Balvin, American rapper Future, British rapper Stefflon Don, and Spanish singer Juan Magán. It was released on 15 December 2017 through Island Records and Universal Music.

Other versions
A version by Jonas Blue was released in March 2018. ClashMusic.com described this version as a "fiery Friday anthem".

A version by Jax Jones was released in January 2018. Billboard has ranked the remix as one of the best Dance/Electronic remixes of 2018. Billboard also said of the song, "Jax Jones ships the record straight to the club, adding a bassy four-on-the-floor beat while letting the flutes shine."

A version by David Guetta was released on April 27, 2018. As described by Billboard, "Guetta gives Fioti's anthem a big, boisterous intro and some serious snare drum, plus a few electronic elements to let you know you've arrived at the middle of the megaclub dance floor."

A version by MC Fioti was released in January 2021, in the context of the 2019-2021 coronavirus pandemic, incentivizing people to take the COVID-19 vaccine developed in partnership with Instituto Butantan.

Track listing

Charts and certifications

Weekly charts

Year-end charts

Certifications

Release history

References

 

2017 songs
2017 singles
Brazilian songs
Funk carioca
Future (rapper) songs
Island Records singles
J Balvin songs
Juan Magan songs
Portuguese-language songs
Songs about dancing
Songs written by Future (rapper)
Songs written by J Balvin
Songs written by Stefflon Don
Stefflon Don songs
Universal Music Group singles